The FFAS President's Cup is American Samoa's premier knockout tournament in men's football (soccer).

Previous winners
2010: Vailoatai Youth 3–2 (a.e.t.) Lion Heart
2011: Not Held
2012: Taputimu Youth 1–0 Lion Heart
2013: FC SKBC 3–2 Taputimu Youth
2014: Utulei Youth 2–1 Lion Heart

References

External links
American Samoa - List of Shield and Cup Winners, RSSSF.com

Football competitions in American Samoa
National association football cups

pt:Copa Samoa Americana de Futebol